Glenn De Baeremaeker is a former city councillor in Toronto, Ontario, Canada, who represented Ward 38, one of the two former  Scarborough Centre wards from 2003-2018. The son of working-class parents, he has a master's degree in international development and spent six months in Ethiopia at the height of the 1980s famine.

He originally rose to prominence for his work with the Save the Rouge group fighting to keep the Rouge Valley area of Scarborough free from development.  A strong environmentalist, De Baeremaeker is a vegan.  Working as an assistant to city councillor Doug Mahood, De Baeremaeker ran for a seat on Scarborough city council in 1994 but lost to David Soknacki.

Continuing his environmental work, De Baeremaeker became one of the leaders in the effort to save the Oak Ridges Moraine from development.  When Brad Duguid left city council in 2003 to run for the provincial Liberals, De Baeremaeker decided to run for the empty seat and triumphed by a wide margin.

De Baeremaeker was notable for cycling to City Hall from his home in Scarborough almost every day year round. He was a strong advocate for safer road conditions for cyclists.

De Baeremaeker was known for his support of former mayor David Miller's policies, in particular his support of the civic workers' deal to end the 2009 Toronto municipal strike.

In March 2012 Toronto City Council dissolved the Toronto Transit Commission Board and appointed new councillors, including De Baeremaeker, to the Board, a role he continued in during the 2014-2018 Council term. In 2014 he was appointed Deputy Mayor East and a member of the Toronto Region Conservation Authority.

De Baeremaeker was elected as Deputy Speaker of Toronto City Council on April 25, 2018 following the resignation of Shelley Carroll.

After the changes to the City of Toronto ward boundaries imposed by the Ontario Provincial Government of Doug Ford resulted in the disappearance of former Ward 38 Scarborough Centre,  De Baeremaeker announced he would not be running for re-election in the new larger Ward 21 Scarborough Centre in the 2018 Toronto election.

De Baeremaeker now runs a government policy consultancy agency.

Election results

Unofficial results as of October 26, 2010 03:55 AM

Official results as of March 3, 2015 14:09 PM

In 2021, Glenn de Baeremaeker was elected to the Board of Directors of the South Asian Autism Awareness Centre, a local charity he supports.

References

External links

Toronto city councillors
Canadian people of Flemish descent
Year of birth missing (living people)
Living people
Place of birth missing (living people)